Rapunzel syndrome is an extremely rare intestinal condition in humans resulting from ingesting hair (trichophagia). The syndrome is named after the long-haired girl Rapunzel in the fairy tale by the Brothers Grimm. Trichophagia is sometimes associated with the hair-pulling disorder trichotillomania. This syndrome is a rare and unusual form of trichobezoar. Since 1968, there have been fewer than 40 documented cases in the literature. This syndrome occurs when the trichobezoar (hairball) reaches past the small intestine, and sometimes even into the colon producing a long tail-like extension of hair (NCBI, 2016).

Signs and symptoms
The use of the term Rapunzel syndrome first appeared in the literature in 1968.

Characteristics of the syndrome include:
 The body of a trichobezoar (hairball) located in the stomach, and its tail (hence the reference to Rapunzel in the syndrome's name) in the small bowel and/or in the right colon
 Small or large bowel obstruction
 Occurring in psychiatric patients
 Trichotillomania
 Abdominal pain
 Nausea & vomiting
 Gut perforation
 Vitamin B12 deficiency
 Acute pancreatic necrosis

Cause
Rapunzel syndrome is caused by the ingestion of hair. Rapunzel syndrome is characterized by a compulsive disorder of pulling one's own hair and ingesting it. There are several psychiatric disorders that are associated with Rapunzel syndrome, such as trichotillomania, trichophagia, and pica. Trichotillomania is the compulsion to pull out one's own hair; if an individual consumes it after ripping it out as well, it is known as trichophagia. Pica comes from the Latin word for "magpie" and involves the craving of non-food items such as cloth, wool, hair, or even small metallic objects.

Diagnosis
Trichobezoar can be preoperatively diagnosed. However, the diagnosis of the Rapunzel syndrome has to consider several aspects such as the patient's history with disorders like trichophagia and trichotillomania. This syndrome does not appear in the DSM V,  and will therefore not be given as such, but will have been diagnosed as severe trichotillomania. The syndrome itself is used to describe the manifestation of a trichobezoar which has extended far into the small intestine. It describes the trichobezoar, not the mental health disorder which precipitated it.

The diagnosis of the syndrome is also done by endoscopy. A CT scan is recommended to determine the size and the extension of the trichobezoar. Upper GI endoscopy is known as the gold standard for the diagnosis of a trichobezoar, however the endoscopy alone might not necessarily detect the co-existing Rapunzel syndrome.

Treatment 
Because the human gastrointestinal tract is unable to digest human hair, the trichobezoar may have to be treated surgically. This involves removal of the mass by careful extraction from the stomach and duodenum. If the mass is small enough it can be removed endoscopically. Once the mass surpasses greater than 20 centimeters, it must be removed by gastrotomy. It is recommended that general anesthesia with intubation be used when removing the hairball in order to protect the throat from any damage. Patients usually also require psychiatric evaluation and treatment due to the association with impulse control disorders, especially trichotillomania. Long-term follow up as well as psychiatric consultation is also recommended to prevent the event from repeating.

Outcomes 
The expected outlook after surgical intervention is very promising. The success rate of removal of the mass is above 90% and the complication rate is only near 10%. Recurrence is highly uncommon but can occur if the patient does not follow up on psychological treatment or counseling.

Epidemiology 
Rapunzel syndrome is extremely rare, with less than 64 cases reported since 1968. It is more common in young or adolescent females. Rapunzel syndrome is mainly seen in emotionally disturbed or mentally disturbed young females. The first known case dates back to a 16-year-old boy in 1779; this was eventually published by Vaughan et al. in 1968. Of the cases reported, the typical age range affected from this syndrome is between 4 and 19 years of age. There is no specific region that is subject to developing this condition, however of the cases reported all of the women came from countries where women traditionally had long hair. Women are more subject to this disorder because women often have longer hair than men. There is only one reported male case of Rapunzel syndrome, but he was eating his sister's hair and not his own.

Research 
Although this condition is extremely rare, researchers have mentioned that it is absolutely critical that prevention methods are taken after surgery. The most common reason for recurrence in patients is lack of follow-up care and incompletion of psychological treatment. Researchers have concluded that 92.5% of all cases reported were treated by laparotomy with a 99% success rate (NCBI,2016). There have been few reports of successful treatment through laparoscopic surgery, however this has only been reported to be done in pediatric patients.

References

Further reading 
 
 
 
 

Diseases of intestines
Syndromes